The 2002–03 Sam Houston State Bearkats men's basketball team represented Sam Houston State University in the 2002–03 college basketball season. This was head coach Bob Marlin's fifth season at Sam Houston State. The Bearkats competed in the Southland Conference and played their home games at Bernard Johnson Coliseum. They finished the season 237, 173 in Southland play to capture the regular season championship. They also were champions of the 2003 Southland Conference men's basketball tournament to earn the conferences automatic bid to the 2003 NCAA Division I men's basketball tournament. They earned a 14 seed in the South Region and were defeated by 3 seed Florida in the first round.

Roster

Source

Schedule and results

All times are Central

|-
!colspan=10 style=| Regular season

|-
!colspan=10 style=| Southland regular season

|-
!colspan=10 style=| Southland tournament

|-
!colspan=10 style=| NCAA tournament

Source

References

Sam Houston State Bearkats
Sam Houston State
Sam Houston Bearkats men's basketball seasons
San Antonio
San Antonio